The 1940 United States presidential election in South Dakota took place on November 5, 1940, as part of the 1940 United States presidential election. Voters chose four representatives, or electors, to the Electoral College, who voted for president and vice president.

South Dakota was won by Wendell Willkie (R–New York), running with Minority Leader Charles L. McNary, with 57.41% of the popular vote, against incumbent President Franklin D. Roosevelt (D–New York), running with Secretary Henry A. Wallace, with 42.59% of the popular vote.

South Dakota would prove to be Willkie's largest win of any state, as he carried the state by 14.82 percentage points. Additionally, with 57.41% of the popular vote, South Dakota was Willkie's strongest state in the 1940 election in terms of popular vote percentage.

Results

Results by county

See also
 United States presidential elections in South Dakota

Notes

References

South Dakota
1940
1940 South Dakota elections